The 1968 United States presidential election in Nebraska took place on November 5, 1968, as part of the 1968 United States presidential election. Voters chose five representatives, or electors, to the Electoral College, who voted for president and vice president.

Nebraska was won by the Republican candidate former Vice President Richard Nixon, with 59.82% of the popular vote, against the Democratic candidate former Senator and incumbent Vice President Hubert Humphrey, with 31.81% of the popular vote. American candidate George Wallace performed decently, finishing with 8.36% of the popular vote.

With 59.82% of the popular vote, Nebraska would prove to be Nixon's best state in the election, just as it had been eight years earlier.

Results

Results by county

See also
 United States presidential elections in Nebraska

Notes

References

Nebraska
1968
1968 Nebraska elections